Retreat is a rural locality in the local government areas (LGA) of Launceston and George Town in the Launceston LGA region of Tasmania. The 2016 census recorded a population of 18 for the state suburb of Retreat.

History 
Retreat was gazetted as a locality in 1964. The name was in use by 1915 but there is no record of its origin.

Geography
The boundaries consist primarily of survey lines.

Road infrastructure 
Route C819 (Hextalls Road / Yondover Road / Retreat Road) passes through from south-east to north.

References

Towns in Tasmania
Localities of City of Launceston
Localities of George Town Council